The bigeye lates (Lates mariae) is a species of lates perch native to Lake Tanganyika and from the Lualaba drainage in the Democratic Republic of the Congo. It is known to make diurnal migrations to surface waters to prey on pelagic fishes. This species can reach a length of  TL. This species is commercially important and is also popular as a game fish.

References

Lates
Taxonomy articles created by Polbot